The BJJR Bulldog is a British autogyro under development by BJJR of Derby and publicly introduced at the AERO Friedrichshafen airshow in 2015. The company was founded in 2014 by Barry Jones and James Robb. The aircraft is intended to be supplied complete and ready-to-fly.

Design and development
The Bulldog features a single main rotor, a two-seats-in tandem open cockpit with two windshields, conventional landing gear and a nine-cylinder, air-cooled, four-stroke, dual-ignition  Rotec R3600 radial engine in tractor configuration. The aircraft fuselage is made from composite materials.

Styled as a 1930s aircraft, the design employs an unusual curved main rotor mast that also serves as a vertical stabilizer.

Specifications (Bulldog)

See also
List of rotorcraft

References

External links

Bulldog
Proposed aircraft of the United Kingdom
Single-engined tractor autogyros